Khalid Kishtainy (born 10 October 1929) is an Iraqi writer and satirist living in London.

Life
Born in Baghdad, Kishtainy trained as a lawyer and artist, graduating in painting from Baghdad's Institute of Fine Arts in 1952 and gaining a law degree from the University of Baghdad in 1953. After the 1958 Iraq Revolution broke out he stopped teaching painting in Baghdad and moved to London to work for the BBC. Since 1989 he has written a daily satirical column in al-Sharq al-Awsat.

Works
 Verdict in Absentia: A Study of the Palestine Case as represented to the Western World, Palestine Liberation Organization Research Center, 1969
 Whither Israel? A Study of Zionist Expansionism, Palestine Liberation Organization Research Center, 1970
 Palestine in Perspective, Palestine Liberation Organization, 1971
 The New Statesman and the Middle East, Palestine Research Center, 1972
 Social and Foreign Affairs in Iraq, 1979
 The Prostitute in Progressive Literature, Allison & Busby, 1982
 Arab Political Hhumour, Quartet Books, 1985; 1992
 Tales from Old Baghdad: Grandma and I, Routledge, 1997
 Tomorrow is Another Day: A Tale of Saddam’s Baghdad, Elliott & Thompson Ltd, 2003
 By the Rivers of Babylon, Quartet Books, 2008
 Arabian Tales: Baghdad-on-Thames, Quartet Books, 2011

References

External links
 Susannah Tarbush, In honour of Khalid Kishtainy: an evening of humour, writing, music and painting at London's Iraqi Cultural Centre, 13 June 2013

1929 births
Living people
Iraqi writers
Satirists